The 1991–92 National Football League, known for sponsorship reasons as the Royal Liver Assurance National Football League, was the 61st staging of the National Football League (NFL), an annual Gaelic football tournament for the Gaelic Athletic Association county teams of Ireland.

Derry defeated Tyrone in the final.

Format 

1991-92 saw a change in format, with a change in the number of divisions from three to two. The format proved unpopular and lasted for just one year. One of the main reasons that it became unpopular was that it guaranteed teams five games, whereas the previous format guaranteed seven.

Divisions
 Division One: 18 teams. Split into three groups of 6 teams each. 
 Division Two: 14 teams. Split into two groups of 7 teams each.

Round-robin format
Each team played every other team in its division (or group where the division is split) once, either home or away.

Points awarded
2 points were awarded for a win and 1 for a draw.

Titles
Teams in both divisions competed for the National Football League title.

Knockout stage qualifiers

 Division One (A): top 2 teams 
 Division One (B): top 2 teams 
 Division One (C): top 2 teams 
 Division Two (A): top team
 Division Two (B): top team

Promotion and relegation

There was no promotion or relegation, as the GAA decided to move to a "mixed ability" system on a one-off basis for 1992-93. This was to facilitate the re-structuring of the league into four divisions.

Group stage

Division One

Group A play-off

Group C play-offs

Group A Table

Group B Table

Group C Table

Division Two

Group B play-off

Group A Table

Group B Table

Knockout stages

Quarter-finals

Semi-finals

Finals

References

External links

National Football League
National Football League
National Football League (Ireland) seasons